Merløsegaard is a manor house located 9 kilometres north of Ringsted, close to the village of Store Merløse, Holbæk Municipality, some  sixty kilometres southwest of Copenhagen, Denmark. Merløsegaard and nearby Bonderup are owned by Den Suhrske Stiftelse. The buildings are now operated as a hotel and event venue.

History

Early history
 
The estate was established as a manor in 1678 by colonel Lauritz Munk. The requirement for an estate to have status of sædegård ("seat") was 200 tønder hartkorn of land within a distance of 2 Danish miles and the reward was tax exemption and other privileges.

Merløsegaard was later sold to assessor Eiler Jacobsen Eilert, the owner of neighboring Bonderup. He had previously also been the owner of Tårnborg at Korsør from 1692 to 1699,

In 1719,Eilert sold Merløsegaard to Poul Sadolin. After just four years, he sold the estate to  district judge Johannes Christiansen who soon thereafter sold it to Johannes Winckler. He was already leasing Skjoldenæsholm.

In 1727, Merløsegaard  was acquired by count Ferdinand Anton Danneskiold-Laurvig. Merløsegaard  was after his death in 1754 passed on to his son Frederik Ludvig Danneskiold-Laurvig.

Neergaard family
Danneskiold-Laurvig's heirs sold the estate to War Councillor Peter Johansen Neergaard in 1763. He was succeeded on the estate by his youngest son Johan Thomas de Neergaard. His son, Peter Johansen Neergaard, passed it on to his nephew, Tønnes Christian Bruun de Neergaard.

Moltke and Knuth
In 1706, Merløsegaard was sold to Frederik Knuth. He soon thereafter sold the estate to Count Adam Wilhelm Moltke of Bregentved. He served as the first Prime Minister of Denmark in the new constitutional monarchy from 1848 to 1852.

Suhr family
Johannes Theodorus Suhr, a wealthy merchant from Copenhagen, purchased the estate in 1858. Suhr ceded Merløsegaard and Bonderup to a new family trust,  Den Sturhske Stiftels.

Architecture
The current main building was constructed after a fire in 1928. It is a one-storey, white-washed building with a half-hipped Mansard roof clad with red tile. It is set in a park with 300-years old oak trees, mirror pond and rose garden.

Today
Merløsegaard and Bonderup are still owned by Den Suhrske Stiftelse. The two estates have a combined area of 1,310 hectares. Merløsegaard's main building is operated as a seven-room hotel and event venue by a tenant. The hotel is a member of Small Danish Hotels.

List of owners
 (1678- ) Lauritz Munk 
 ( -1719) Eiler Jacobsen Eilert 
 (1719-1723) Poul Sadolin 
 (1723) Johannes Christensen 
 (1723-1727) Johannes Winckler 
 (1727-1754) Ferdinand Anton Danneskiold-Laurvig
 (1754-1763) Frederik Ludvig Danneskiold-Laurvig 
(* 1763-1772) Peter Johansen Neergaard
 (1772-1795) Johan Thomas Petersen de Neergaard
 (1795-1796) Peter Johansen Neegaard 
 (1797-1807) Tønnes Christian Bruun de Neergaard 
 (1807- ) Frederik Knuth 
 ( -1858) Adam Wilhelm Moltke
 (1858) Johannes Theodorus Suhr
 (1858- ) Den Suhrske Stiftelse

References

Rxternal links
 Merløsegaard Hotel
 Source

Manor houses in Holbæk Municipality
Hotels in Denmark
Buildings and structures associated with the Neergaard family
Buildings and structures associated with the Suhr family
1678 establishments in Denmark
Houses completed in 1928